The 2023 Texas A&M–Corpus Christi Islanders baseball team represents Texas A&M University–Corpus Christi during the 2023 NCAA Division I baseball season. The Islanders play their home games at Chapman Field. They are led by sixteenth–year head coach Scott Malone and are members of the Southland Conference.

Preseason

Southland Conference Coaches Poll
The Southland Conference Coaches Poll was released on February 3, 2023. Texas A&M-Corpus Christi was picked to finish seventh in the Southland Conference with 55 votes.

Preseason All-Southland team
Three Texas A&M-Corpus Christi players were named to the conference preseason first team.  One player was named to the conference preseason second team.

First Team
Edgar Alvarez (NICH, JR, 1st Base)
Brad Burckel  (MCNS, SR, 2nd Base)
Josh Leslie (MCNS, SR, 3rd Base)
Parker Coddou (NICH, JR, Shortstop)
Bo Willis (NWST, JR, Catcher)
Tre Jones (TAMUCC, JR, Designated Hitter)
Payton Harden (MCNS, SR, Outfielder)
Brendan Ryan (TAMUCC, SR, Outfielder)
Xane Washington (NICH, R-SR, Outfielder)
Zach Garcia  (TAMUCC, SO, Starting Pitcher)
Grant Rogers (MCNS, JR, Starting Pitcher)
Tyler Theriot (NICH, SR, Starting Pitcher)
Burrell Jones (MCNS, SR, Relief Pitcher)
Alec Carr (UIW, SR, Utility)

Second Team
Josh Blankenship (LU, SR, 1st Base)
Daunte Stuart (NWST, JR, 2nd Base)
Kasten Furr (NO, JR, 3rd Base)
Tyler Bischke (NO, JR, Shortstop)
Bryce Grizzaffi (SELA, SR, Catcher)
Kade Hunter (MCNS, SR, Designated Hitter)
Josh Caraway (TAMUCC, JR, Outfielder)
Braden Duhon (MCNS, JR, Outfielder)
Issac Williams (NO, JR, Outfielder)
Cal Carver  (NWST, SR, Starting Pitcher)
Tyler LeBlanc (NO, JR, Starting Pitcher)
Will Kinzeler (SELA, JR, Starting Pitcher)
Dalton Aspholm (SELA, SR, Relief Pitcher)
Tre’ Obregon III (MCNS, SR, Utility)

Schedule and results

Schedule Source:
*Rankings are based on the team's current ranking in the D1Baseball poll.

References

Texas AandM-Corpus Christi
Texas A&M–Corpus Christi Islanders baseball seasons
Texas AandM-Corpus Christi Islanders baseball